Terinebrica achrostos is a moth of the family Tortricidae. The species was first described by Józef Razowski and Vitor O. Becker in 2001. Its type locality is in Paraná, Brazil.

References

Euliini
Moths described in 2001
Taxa named by Józef Razowski
Tortricidae of South America